Surround Me may refer to:

"Surround Me", song by Grant Mclennan from Fireboy
"Surround Me", song by The Stems from Heads Up
"Surround Me", song by Scott Stapp from The Great Divide